The  is a 104.9-km-long (65.2 mile) north–south (physically northeast–southwest)  National Highway with access control (一般国道自動車専用道路 Ippan-kokudō jidōsha-sen-yō-dōro) in the Kinki region of Japan that connects Kyoto Prefecture to Wakayama Prefecture via Nara Prefecture. It is numbered "E24" under Ministry of Land, Infrastructure, Transport and Tourism's "Expressway Numbering Systemg."

Route description

The Keinawa Expressway generally follows the path of Japan National Route 24 from Kyoto to Wakayama. It begins at an interchange with the Shin-Meishin Expressway near Kyoto City. From Kyoto the expressway travels south through Kansai Science City and Nara Prefecture, then crosses into Wakayama where it runs along the southern side of the Kisen Alps while travelling southwest towards Wakayama where it comes to an end at a junction with the Hanwa Expressway.
There are some gaps in the expressway that are linked by the previously named national highway. The purpose of this route is to serve as a high-speed route from Kyoto to Wakayama, bypassing Osaka to the west.

Naming 
The name Keinawa is a Sino-Japanese pronunciation of a three-character kanji acronym for Kyoto, Nara, and Wakayama (京奈和) that are the names of the three prefectures in the Kinki region that the Keinawa Expressway links. The first character of the three-character kanji that represents Kyoto (京都) is pronounced as kei, whereas the second character of the kanji that represents Nara (奈良) and the third character of it represents Wakayama (和歌山) are pronounced as na and wa respectively.

History
The highway was first proposed in 1973 as bypasses in the Kinki region that were not connected. The first section of the expressway connecting Jōyō, Kyoto and Kyotanabe, Kyoto was opened in 1988. The most recent section to open as of May 2018 was between the southern terminus with the Hanwa Expressway and Iwade-Negoro in Wakayama.

Interchange list

References

See also
Transport in Keihanshin
West Nippon Expressway Company

Expressways in Japan
Roads in Kyoto Prefecture
Roads in Nara Prefecture
Roads in Wakayama Prefecture